Elections to South Ribble Borough Council were held on 6 May 1999. The whole council was up for election and the council stayed under no overall control.

Election result

|}

Ward Results

References
 The Elections Centre, South Ribble Borough Council Election Results (PDF)

1999 English local elections
1999
1990s in Lancashire